Kulić is Czech surname. Notable people with the surname include:

Marek Kulič (born 1975), Czech footballer

See also
Kulic (surname)
Kulić, surname
Kulich (surname)

Czech-language surnames
Surnames from nicknames